Dorothea of Brandenburg (1430/1431 – 10 November 1495) was a Hohenzollern princess who became a Scandinavian queen by marriage under the Kalmar Union. She was Queen of Denmark, Norway, and Sweden from her marriage to King Christopher III in 1445 until Christopher died in 1448. As the wife of King Christian I, Dorothea was Queen of Denmark from their marriage in 1449 and Queen of Norway from 1450 until Christian's death in 1481. She was also Queen of Sweden during Christian's reign in that kingdom from 1457 to 1464. She served as interim regent during the interregnum in 1448, and as regent in the absence of her second spouse during his reign. She was the mother of two future kings of Denmark: John (r. 1481–1513) and Frederick I (r. 1523–1533).

Early life

Dorothea was born in 1430 or 1431 to John, Margrave of Brandenburg-Kulmbach, and Barbara of Saxe-Wittenberg (1405–1465). She had two sisters: Barbara (1423–1481), who became Marchioness of Mantua, and Elisabeth (14??-1451), who became Duchess of Pomerania.
From about the age of eight, she lived in Bayreuth, where her father was ruler. In 1443, Christopher of Bavaria, the newly elected King of Denmark, Sweden and Norway, inherited Oberpfalz close to Bayreuth, and a marriage was suggested between Christopher and Dorothea to secure her father's support for Christopher's power over his German domain. The engagement was proclaimed prior to the application of Papal dispensation for affinity in February 1445, which was approved 10 March.

Marriage to Christopher of Bavaria
On 12 September 1445, the wedding ceremony was conducted between Christopher and Dorothea in Copenhagen, followed by the coronation of Dorothea as queen. The King had financed it with a special tax in all three Kingdoms, and the occasion is described as one of the most elaborate in Nordic Medieval history. The festivities lasted for eight days and was attended by the Princes of Braunschweig, Hesse and Bavaria and envoys of the Hanseatic League and the Teutonic Order as well as the nobility of Denmark, Sweden and Norway. Dorothea made her entrance in the city escorted by noblemen from all three Kingdoms dressed in gold riding on white horses, and crowned Queen of Denmark, Sweden and Norway by bishops from all three Kingdoms with the golden crown from the Vadstena Abbey. On 15 September, she was granted dowers in all three Kingdoms: Roskilde, Ringsted, Haraldsborg and Skioldenses in Denmark; Jämtland in Norway, and Örebro, Närke and Värmland in Sweden. Should she chose to live outside of Scandinavia as a widow, she would instead be given a fortune of 45,000 Rhine guilders, one third from each Kingdom.

Queen Dorothea left for Sweden with the King in January 1446, where they visited Vadstena Abbey and her dower Örebro. During this visit, she met her future antagonist Charles, Lord High Constable of Sweden. According to the chronicle Karlskrönikan, their meeting was a good one during which presented her and her ladies-in-waiting with many gifts. The couple returned to Denmark in September. 
The marriage between Dorothea and Christopher was politically favorable: her father governed Christopher's German domain and was a loyal supporter and adviser. It did not result in any offspring, however, and according to Ericus Olai, the marriage was in fact not sexually active.

In January 1448, King Christopher died childless, which resulted in a succession crisis that immediately broke the Kalmar Union of the three Kingdoms. Queen dowager Dorothea, being the only royal in Denmark, was proclaimed interim regent of Denmark until a new monarch could be elected. In Sweden, however, the Lord High Constable was elected as King Charles VIII, who was soon elected king of Norway as well. In September, Christian of Oldenburg was elected monarch as Christian I of Denmark and the queen dowager turned over the power to him upon his election.

Marriage to Christian I of Denmark
Queen Dorothea was given a proposal from king Casimir IV of Poland and Albert VI, Archduke of Austria, but she chose to remain in Denmark and marry the newly elected king, Christian I of Denmark. The wedding ceremony was conducted 26 October 1449, followed by the coronation of Christian and herself as king and queen of Denmark. She renounced her existing dower lands in Denmark and Norway, which were replaced with Kalundborg and Samsø in Denmark, and Romerike in Norway, but refused to renounce her Swedish dower lands. The election of Charles as king in Sweden and Norway deprived her of her dower lands in these kingdoms, and her as well as Christian's ambition was to have Christian crowned in Sweden and Norway as well, and thereby reunite the shattered Kalmar Union.

Christian was crowned in Norway as well in 1450. The task to win back Sweden was more difficult, and Dorothea upheld as several years long campaign recruiting followers among the Swedish clerics and nobility, to which she stated that their elected king Charles VIII, as her former Lord Constable and subject, was to be regarded as an usurper and a traitor who had broken his vow by depriving her, his former queen, of her dower lands in Sweden. In 1455, she also appealed to the Pope. In February 1457 her campaign was crowned with success when the rebellion of Archbishop Jöns Bengtsson Oxenstierna deposed Charles VIII, who fled to Germany, and in July 1457, Christian was elected king of Sweden, thereby again uniting the union of the three Nordic kingdoms. Dorothea made an official entry in Stockholm in December, and her Swedish dower lands was returned to her: in May 1458, further more, the Swedish council approved her and Christian's wish that their sons be secured the succession to the Swedish throne, a position they had already been secured in Denmark and Norway. The king and queen returned to Denmark in July.

In 1460, Christian bought the Duchy of Schleswig and Holstein, which placed him in debt, forced him to raise taxes and destroyed his support in Sweden, who again elected Charles VIII as king in 1464. The loss of Sweden was reportedly a blow to queen Dorothea, who started a lifelong campaign to have her spouse (and later her son) again elected king of Sweden, to restore the Kalmar Union of the three Kingdoms and to retrieve her Swedish dower lands. 
The loss of her personal dower lands enabled her to personally pursue the Swedish cause in court, and she sued Charles VIII before the Pope in Rome for depriving her of her dower lands. When Charles VIII was succeeded as the regent of Sweden by Sten Sture the Elder, she pursued her case against him. 
In 1475, she traveled to Italy and visited her sister Barbara in Mantua, and Pope Sixtus IV in Rome, and formally applied to have Sten Sture excommunicated. By use of an excommunication, the Swedish regent would be unable to govern and the Swedish kingdom would be economically and politically ruined, which would result in the fall of the Swedish regent and the election of the Danish king as king of Sweden, which was a policy she withheld and worked for her last twenty years. Following her visit to Rome in May 1475, Sixtus IV subsequently issued a bull to King Christian permitting the establishment of a university in Denmark. As a result, the University of Copenhagen was inaugurated in 1479.

In Denmark, queen Dorothea was granted the Slotsloven, which gave her the right to command all the castles in Denmark, and she served as regent whenever  the king was absent. Her personal wealth also gave her influence. When king Christian acquired Holstein and Schleswig in 1460 and was unable to pay, she loaned him the amount necessary to buy these domains and incorporate them into Denmark. By 1470, she had de facto seized control over Holstein and Schleswig: when Christian was unable to pay back the loan she had given him to buy the domains, she took over the rule of Holstein (1479) and Schleswig (1480) herself and ruled them as her own fiefs. After the death of her father in 1464, she battled her uncle Frederick II, Elector of Brandenburg, over the inheritance.

Queen Dorothea has been described as efficient and ambitious, haughty and frugal.

Queen Dowager
Christian I died on 21 May 1481 and was succeeded by her son John, King of Denmark. As queen dowager, she preferred to reside at Kalundborg Castle. She remained politically active during the reign of her son until her death. She granted the Duchy of Schleswig-Holstein to her younger son Frederick, but it caused a conflict with her elder son and ended in the division of the Duchy between her sons.

Dorothea continued with her ambition to reunite the Kalmar Union of the Nordic Kingdoms, now by her having her son elected king of Sweden rather than her spouse, by means of ousting the Swedish regent through an excommunication officially for the theft of her Swedish dower lands. In January 1482, she stated this plan for her son the king, and in 1488, she made a second trip to her sister Barbara in Mantua, meeting the Holy Roman Emperor Frederick III in Innsbrück on the way, and visited Pope Innocent VIII in Rome, where she again pressed the matter of an excommunication of the Swedish regent and place the kingdom of Sweden under Interdict. It was with great difficulty that the Swedish envoy in Rome, Hemming Gadh, managed to prevent this. The queen dowager continued this process until her death: the matter was not resolved until three years after her death, when her son, the year prior elected king of Sweden, stated that he did not wish to pursue the matter further. Though she died two years before her son was elected king of Sweden, her work is regarded to have contributed to this outcome.

Dorothea died on 25 November 1495, and is interred next to her second spouse in Roskilde Cathedral.

Issue

References

Further reading

External links

 Dansk kvindebiografisk leksikon (Danish)
 

|-

|-

|-

1430s births
1495 deaths
Year of birth uncertain
House of Hohenzollern
House of Palatinate-Neumarkt
Danish royal consorts
Norwegian royal consorts
Dorothy
Countesses of Oldenburg
Regents of Denmark
15th-century women rulers
Burials at Roskilde Cathedral
15th-century Swedish people
15th-century Swedish women
15th-century German women
15th-century German people
15th-century Danish women
15th-century Danish people
15th-century Norwegian people
15th-century Norwegian women
Remarried royal consorts
Christian I of Denmark
Queen mothers
Daughters of monarchs